Nazareth is a native community in the Bagua Province, Amazonas Region, Peru.

References 

 Geographical Data about Nazareth, Peru (Falling Rain Genomics)

Populated places in the Amazonas Region